The IV Army Corps was a military formation of the Spanish Republican Army that fought during the Spanish Civil War. It had a relevant role during the Battle of Guadalajara and, later, during the Casado coup. Among its commanders there were prestigious military personnel such as Enrique Jurado Barrio and Cipriano Mera.

History 
The unit was created on March 13, 1937, in the middle of the Battle of Guadalajara. It was organized hastily, the 11th, 12th and 14th divisions were integrated into the Corps, under the command of Enrique Jurado Barrio and mainly Vicente Rojo Lluch. During the following days, the forces of the IV Army Corps managed to stop the offensive of the Corpo Truppe Volontarie, going on the counterattack. On March 18, the 11th and 14th divisions converged on Brihuega with the support of 70 Soviet T-26 tanks; the town was almost surrounded by the republicans when a disbandment of its Italian defenders took place, which left behind many prisoners and war material. The operations continued until March 23. The unit established its headquarters in Guadalajara.

During the rest of the war, it did not intervene in relief operations and remained covering the inactive Guadalajara front.

At the beginning of 1939 the army corps grouped the 12th, 14th, 17th and 33rd divisions into its ranks, under the command of the anarchist Cipriano Mera. The IV Army Corps played a key role in the success of the Casado coup, as it sent several units to Madrid to support the rebel forces in the capital. A powerful column composed of the 35th, 50th and 90th mixed brigades, and under the command of Liberino González, it managed to recover several key positions for the rebels.

The unit dissolved itself at the end of March 1939, with the end of the civil war.

Command 
Commanders
 Vicente Rojo Lluch;
 Enrique Jurado Barrio;
 Juan Arce Mayora;
 Juan Perea Capulino;
 Cipriano Mera;

Commissars
 Sebastián Zapirain Aguinaga, of the PCE;
 Feliciano Benito Anaya, of the CNT;

Chiefs of Staff
 Aniceto Carvajal Sobrino;
 Francisco Arderiu Perales;
 Miguel Rodríguez Pavón;
 Antonio Verardini Díez de Ferreti

Organization

Notes

References

Bibliography
 
 
 
 
 
 
 
 
 
 
 

Military units and formations established in 1937
Military units and formations disestablished in 1939
Corps of Spain
Military units and formations of the Spanish Civil War
Military history of Spain
Armed Forces of the Second Spanish Republic
1937 establishments in Spain
1939 disestablishments in Spain